Xenopholis is a genus of rear-fanged snakes of the family Colubridae.

Geographic range
The genus Xenopholis is endemic to South America.

Description
The genus Xenopholis is characterized by distinctive vertebrae.  The spinous processes are expanded dorsally, forming shields which are rugose and divided by a median groove.

Species
Three species are recognized as being valid.
 Xenopholis scalaris (Wucherer, 1861)
 Xenopholis undulatus (Jensen, 1900)
 Xenopholis werdingorum Jansen, L. Álvarez & Köhler, 2009

Nota bene: A binomial authority in parentheses indicates that the species was originally described in a genus other than Xenopholis.

References

Further reading
Peters W (1869). "Über neue Gattungen und neue oder weniger bekannte Arten von Amphibien ( ... Xenopholis ... ) ". Monatsberichte der Königlich Preussischen Akademie der Wissenschaften zu Berlin 1869: 432–447. (Xenopholis, new genus, p. 440). (in German).

Xenopholis
Snake genera
Taxa named by Wilhelm Peters